The 53rd Street station was a local station on the demolished IRT Third Avenue Line in Manhattan, New York City. It was served by local trains and had two tracks and two side platforms. The center track was built as part of the Dual Contracts and was used for express trains. This station closed on May 12, 1955, with the ending of all service on the Third Avenue El south of 149th Street.

References

http://www.nycsubway.org/lines/3rdave-el.html
https://web.archive.org/web/20100609061601/http://www.stationreporter.net/3avl.htm

IRT Third Avenue Line stations
Railway stations closed in 1955
1878 establishments in New York (state)
1955 disestablishments in New York (state)
Former elevated and subway stations in Manhattan

Third Avenue